Parita Creek is a stream in southeastern Bexar County, Texas. The stream rises near Adkins and runs southwest for ten miles before meeting Calaveras Creek near Elmendorf.

See also 

 List of rivers of Texas

References

Bexar County, Texas
Rivers of Texas